is a Japanese dancer and producer. He is the leader of Exile and the creative leader of LDH World.

Igarashi grew up in Yokohama, Kanagawa Prefecture. His wife is actress Aya Ueto. Igarashi retired from performing with Exile in 2013, and has concentrated on the producer industry since then.

Early life 
Hiroyuki Igarashi was born on June 1, 1969 in Takehara, Hiroshima Prefecture and grew up in Yokohama, Kanagawa Prefecture. He graduated from Yokohama City Hama Junior High School and Yokohama City Kanazawa High School. During his time in high school, he met Matsuura Masato, who was the manager of the rental record store “Tomo & Ai” in Kamiooka back then. After graduating from high school, Hiroyuki refined his dancing skills while working at Disco Maharaja and Circus in Roppongi.

In 1989, at the age of 20, the circus store manager asked Hiroyuki to advertise the store which led him to participate as the runner-up in the dance contest of the TV program “DADA”. The scout who was watching the contest suggested that Hiroyuki should become part of a dance team from the program, which led to the group LMD being formed.

Career 
In 1990, Hiro debuted as a member of the group LMD, modified as ZOO.  In 1991, the dance team Japanese Soul Brothers was formed, which included Igarashi as a member. They participated in Bobby Brown's tour in Japan.  In 1995, ZOO broke up. Following the disbandment, Hiro participated in DREAMS COME TRUE's tour as a back dancer.  In 1996, the group LUV DELUXE was formed but dissolved the following year.

In 1999, Hiro founded the group J Soul Brothers.  On August 24, 2001, J Soul Brothers changed their name to EXILE.  On October 17, 2002, the group established Exile Entertainment Co., Ltd..  On September 18, 2003, LDH Co., Ltd. was established.  On April 3, 2013, Hiro announced that he would retire from being a performer within the year and concentrate on the producer business. The “64th NHK Kohako Uta Gassen” on December 31 was his last activity as a performer.  In 2014, PKCZ was formed.

In March 2015, he became a member of the Tokyo 2020 Culture and Education Commission. Later that year he was awarded the Commissioner for Cultural Affairs Award by the Japanese Government's Agency for Cultural Affairs for his contribution to Japan's artistic culture.  On January 1, 2017, it was announced that Hiro would become the CCO of LDH WORLD. At the same time, he retired from his president position within LDH and became a chairman of the company.

On November 8, 2019, the Tokyo Organising Committee of the Olympic and Paralympic Games (Tokyo 2020) announced the appointment of Exile Hiro as the director of the Tokyo 2020 cultural segment of the Olympic Flame Handover Ceremony. The ceremony, during which the Olympic Flame will be passed from the Hellenic Olympic Committee to Tokyo 2020 representatives, will be held at the Panathenaic Stadium in Athens on 19 March 2020. After a cultural performance by Greek dancers and entertainers, the host country of Japan will stage its own cultural performance, under Hiro's direction. Hiro himself expressed his goal to center the performance on children, who embody Japan's hope for the future, and to make it the highest priority "that the children will experience something they can take with them for the rest of their lives and to have it be an experience that will inspire them to build a bright future together". The concept for the Tokyo 2020 Olympic Torch Relay will be: “Hope Lights Our Way”.

Participating groups

Personal life

Family 
On September 14, 2012, it was personally announced by Hiro and Aya Ueto that they registered their marriage after two years of dating. They had met through a mutual acquaintance, who was the dance instructor for the idol group Z-1 of which Aya was a former member.

On April 12, 2015, Aya Ueto revealed that she was pregnant with the couple's first child. Their first daughter was born on August 19, 2015.  On June 12, 2019, it was announced via official news outlets that the couple were expecting their second child. On July 27, 2019, the birth of their second child, a boy, was announced.

Other 
On April 17, 2014, Hiro attended the “Spring Garden Party” hosted by the Emperor and Empress of Japan. On October 6 of the same year, he was invited to attend the wedding reception for Noriko Senge and Kunimaro Senge due to his friendship with the Senge family.

Productions

Artists
Exile
Exile The Second
Nidaime J Soul Brothers
Sandaime J Soul Brothers from Exile Tribe
Generations from Exile Tribe
The Rampage from Exile Tribe
Fantastics from Exile tribe
Ballistik Boyz from Exile Tribe
E-girls
Happiness
Flower
SudannaYuzuYully
ShuuKaRen
Samurize from Exile Tribe
PKCZ

Programmes

Manga

Anime

Magazines

Films

Others

Works

Books

Videography

Compositions

Filmography

TV series

Advertisements

Radio

Awards

References

Notes

External links
 

1969 births
Living people
People from Hiroshima Prefecture
People from Yokohama
Japanese male dancers
Japanese record producers
Japanese businesspeople
LDH (company) artists